Arturo García Buhr (16 December 1905 – 4 October 1995) was an Argentine actor and film director. He appeared in 30 films between 1933 and 1985. He starred in the film The Party Is Over, which was entered into the 10th Berlin International Film Festival. At the 1943 Argentine Film Critics Association Awards, Buhr won the  Silver Condor Award for Best Actor for his performance in The Kids Grow Up (Los chicos crecen) (1942).

Selected filmography

As actor
 Dancing (1933)
 Such Is Life (1939)
 The Englishman of the Bones (1940)
 You Are My Love (1941)
 The Kids Grow Up (1942)
 Lauracha (1946)
 Los Isleros (1951)
 The Party Is Over (1960)
 Un Guapo del '900 (1960)
 Los Guerrilleros (1965)
 Yesterday's Guys Used No Arsenic (1976)
 Broken Comedy (1978)

As director
Delirio (1944)
 No salgas esta noche (1946)
 Lauracha (1946)
 ¿Vendrás a medianoche? (1950)
 Mi mujer, la sueca y yo (1967)

References

External links
 
 

1905 births
1995 deaths
Argentine male film actors
Argentine film directors
Male actors from Buenos Aires
Argentine people of German descent
Burials at La Recoleta Cemetery
Silver Condor Award for Best Actor winners
20th-century Argentine male actors
1995 suicides
Suicides by firearm in Argentina